Sakura is a full-length album from electronic artist Susumu Yokota, released in 1999 in Japan on Skintone (STR03) and on 11 September 2000 in the United Kingdom on The Leaf Label (BAY13). It was named as the top electronic release of the year 2000 by The Wire.

Some tracks sample elements of Harold Budd's album "The Pavilion of Dreams". Track two, "Tobiume", samples the opening track ("Bismillahi 'Rrahmani 'Rahim"); track four, "Hagoromo", features a sample from "Let Us Go Into The House of the Lord/Butterfly Sunday", and track eleven - "Shinsen" - opens with a sample from "Rosetti Noise/Chrystal Garden and a Coda".

Track six, "Gekkoh", features a sample from the opening of Steve Reich's "Music for 18 Musicians", and also contains elements of Young Marble Giants' "The Taxi" (from their album Colossal Youth).

Track eight, "Azukiiro No Kaori", contains samples from the Return to Forever song "Sometime Ago/La Fiesta" from Return to Forever.

Track nine, "Kodomotachi", features a sample from Joni Mitchell's song "Songs to Aging Children Come" from Clouds.

Track ten, "Naminote", features a sample from Chick Corea & Gary Burton's track "Señor Mouse" from Crystal Silence.

Track listing

Double-LP

References

Susumu Yokota albums
1999 albums